2013 in esports (pro gaming)

Calendar

(for extended events the final date is listed)
 

 
Esports by year